Vytenis Rimkus  (17 January 1930 – 12 November 2020) was a Lithuanian painter and encyclopedist from the Siauliai district municipality.  He was sent to the gulag for anti-Soviet activity.  After his release he attended and graduated from an art school in Leningrad.

References

Lithuanian painters
Lithuanian encyclopedists
1930 births
2020 deaths